Closer to You is the 11th studio album by J. J. Cale, released in 1994. It was published under the independent French label Delabel and distributed by Virgin Records.

Recording
Closer to You is best remembered for the change in sound from Cale’s previous albums due to the prominence of synthesizers, with Cale employing the instrument on five of the twelve songs.  Although the use of synthesizers may have seemed like a left turn for hardcore fans used to his laidback, rootsy sound, it was not new; Cale had used synthesizers on his 1976 Troubadour album.  In an interview with Vintage Guitar in 2004, Cale acknowledged the dismay some fans felt, recalling:

On Closer to You Cale used two bass players (electric and acoustic), three percussionists (including Jim Keltner), three guitarists (including Cale), two keyboardists (Spooner Oldham and Bill Payne), and three horn players.  The horns are used on the closing track “Steve’s Song,” which AllMusic describes as a “hypnotically groovy instrumental.”  The same review also complements the electronic treatment of Cale’s vocals on the title track, a technique that surprisingly makes him sound as down-to-earth as ever.”  In truth, the majority of the songs boast the sound that Cale is so well-known for.  The lusty “Slower Baby” and the breezy “Sho-Biz Blues” are characteristic Cale tracks, with the latter documenting the bleak realities of a musician’s life.  (“The bus breaks down and the motel’s bad, you’re always in a stew…”)  The foreboding “Borrowed Time” and “Brown Dirt” are meditations on mortality, the latter from the perspective of a Mississippi cotton picker who observes, “Brown dirt, somebody told me, be the last place you lay.”   The gentle love song “Rose in the Garden” appeals for affection while the more direct “Like You Used To” asks a lover to “Tell me that you really love me, even if it ain't true.”  The album also includes one live track, “Hard Love.”

Reception
AllMusic: “With the dazzling Closer to You, J.J. Cale finds ever-newer surprises in his own remarkable corner of the musical world.”

Track listing 
All songs written by J. J. Cale.

 "Long Way Home" – 2:50

 Backing Vocals – Christine Lakeland, Leslie Taylor
 Bass – Tim Drummond
 Drums – James Cruce
 Drums, Percussion – Jim Karstein*
 Guitar – Don Preston 
 Piano, Organ – Bill Payne

2. "Sho-Biz Blues" – 3:39

 Bass – Tim Drummond
 Drums – James Cruce
 Drums, Percussion – Jim Karstein*
 Guitar – Don Preston (2)
 Piano, Organ – Bill Payne

3. "Slower Baby" – 5:00

 Drums, Percussion – Jim Karstein*
 Synthesizer – J.J. Cale

4. "Devil's Nurse" – 3:45
 Synthesizer – J.J. Cale

5. "Like You Used To" – 3:02

 Bass – Tim Drummond
 Drums – James Cruce
 Drums, Percussion – Jim Karstein*
 Guitar – Don Preston (2)
 Piano, Organ – Bill Payne

6 "Borrowed Time" – 4:13
 Bass – Tim Drummond
 Drums – James Cruce
 Drums, Percussion – Jim Karstein*
 Guitar – Don Preston (2)
 Organ – Spooner Oldham
 Piano, Organ – Bill Payne

7. "Rose in the Garden" – 3:00
 Backing Vocals – Christine Lakeland
 Bass – Tim Drummond
 Cello – Nancy Stein*
 Drums – James Cruce
 Drums, Percussion – Jim Karstein*
 Guitar – Don Preston (2)
 Piano, Organ – Bill Payne
 Viola – Marcy Dicterow-Vaj*
 Violin – Sid Page

8. "Brown Dirt" – 3:26
 Synthesizer – J.J. Cale

9. "Hard Love" – 4:18
 Synthesizer – J.J. Cale

10. "Ain't Love Funny" – 2:43
 Accordion – Garth Hudson
 Bass – Tim Drummond
 Drums – Jim Keltner, Jim Karstein*
 Guitar, Backing Vocals – Christine Lakeland
 Violin – Doug Atwell

11. "Closer to You" – 2:46
 Synthesizer – J.J. Cale

12. "Steve's Song" – 4:02
 Acoustic Bass – Larry Taylor
 Bass – Tim Drummond
 Drums – James Cruce, Jim Keltner
 Drums, Percussion – Jim Karstein*
 Guitar – Christine Lakeland, Don Preston (2)
 Organ – Spooner Oldham
 Piano, Organ – Bill Payne
 Saxophone – Lee Allen
 Trombone – George Bohanon
 Trumpet – Steve Madaio

References 

1994 albums
J. J. Cale albums